Harold W. Clemens (October 21, 1918 – December 3, 1998) was an American Republican politician from Wisconsin.

Born in Milwaukee, Wisconsin, Clemens served in the United States Navy during World War II. He worked in manufacturing and managed a recreation area. Clemens served in the Wisconsin State Assembly from 1957 until 1968, when he resigned to fill the vacancy in the office of Wisconsin State Treasurer after the death of Dena A. Smith. He was elected to the office in 1968 and served from 1969 until 1971.

Notes

}

Politicians from Milwaukee
Military personnel from Wisconsin
Republican Party members of the Wisconsin State Assembly
State treasurers of Wisconsin
1918 births
1998 deaths
20th-century American politicians
United States Navy personnel of World War II